Iraj Masjedi was the former Iranian ambassador to Iraq, having previously served in the Revolutionary Guards for 35 years. A veteran of Iran–Iraq War, Masjedi was a senior Quds Force commander and served as a top advisor to Qassem Soleimani. He was designated as the ambassador to Iraq in January 2017 and assumed office in April 2017.

References

1950s births
Living people
Quds Force personnel
Islamic Revolutionary Guard Corps brigadier generals
Islamic Revolutionary Guard Corps personnel of the Iran–Iraq War
Ambassadors of Iran to Iraq
Year of birth missing (living people)